Qyshk (in Albanian) or Ćuška is a village near Peja, in western Kosovo. It is inhabited predominantly by ethnic Albanians.

History 
In May 1999, during the Kosovo War, the Jackals paramilitary unit massacred civilians in the village. Members of this unit are now facing sentences.

Notable people
Agim Çeku, Former Minister of Kosovo Security Force

Annotations

References

External links
 Life in Kosovo: War Crimes (interview with former paramilitary involved in the massacre)

Villages in Peja